Lon taxiles, the taxiles skipper, is a species of grass skipper in the family Hesperiidae. It is found in Central America and North America.

The MONA or Hodges number for Lon taxiles is 4061.

References

 Hodges, Ronald W., et al., eds. (1983). Check List of the Lepidoptera of America North of Mexico, xxiv + 284.
 Opler, Paul A. (1999). A Field Guide to Western Butterflies, Second Edition, xiv + 540.
 Pelham, Jonathan P. (2008). "A catalogue of the butterflies of the United States and Canada with a complete bibliography of the descriptive and systematic literature". Journal of Research on the Lepidoptera, vol. 40, xiv + 658.

Further reading

 Arnett, Ross H. (2000). American Insects: A Handbook of the Insects of America North of Mexico. CRC Press.

Lon